SAPC may refer to:

 St. Andrews Presbyterian College, a former name of St. Andrews University in Laurinburg, North Carolina
 Social, Aid and Pleasure Clubs, organizers of the Second line parades in New Orleans, Louisiana
 Suzuki Advanced Power Control, an electronic power valve and ignition timing control on the Suzuki RGV250 motorcycle
 South African Pagan Council, a South African neopagan organization
 Semi-armor-piercing, capped, a type of armor-piercing shell